Surya Narayan Yadavis an Indian politician. He was a Member of Parliament, representing Saharsa, Bihar in the Lok Sabha the lower house of India's Parliament as a member of the Janata Dal.

References

External links
Official biographical sketch in Parliament of India website

India MPs 1989–1991
India MPs 1991–1996
Lok Sabha members from Bihar
1954 births
Janata Dal politicians
Living people
Lok Janshakti Party politicians